Olamze is a commune in the South Province of Cameroon, located in the department of Vallée-du-Ntem. The commune is on Cameroon's border with Equatorial Guinea. The 2005 census recorded 8,518 inhabitants.

See also
Communes of Cameroon

References

Populated places in South Region (Cameroon)
Communes of Cameroon
Cameroon–Equatorial Guinea border crossings